This is a list of named geological features on Callisto, a moon of Jupiter. This list is complete as of August 2022.

Catenae

Callistoan catenae (crater chains) are named after rivers, valleys, and ravines in myths and folktales of cultures of the Far North (all current names come from Norse mythology).

Craters

Faculae
Faculae (bright spots) on Callisto are named after characters related to frost, snow, cold, and sleet from myths and folktales of people of the Far North.

Large ring features

The enormous impact-related ring features on Callisto are named after places (other than rivers, valleys and ravines) from myths and folktales of the Far North.

References

External links

 USGS, IAU: Callisto nomenclature

Callisto